Mehrnoosh Sadrzadeh is an Iranian British academic who is a professor at University College London. She was awarded a senior research fellowship at the Royal Academy of Engineering in 2022.

Early life and education 
Sadrzadeh is from Iran. She received her undergraduate and masters degrees at Sharif University of Technology. After earning her master's degree Sadrzadeh moved to Canada. She was a doctoral researcher first at the University of Ottawa, where she was awarded an Ontario Graduate Scholarship, a University of Ottawa Excellence Scholarship, and a Canada Female Doctoral Student Award, and then at the Université du Québec à Montréal. Her research considered epistemic logic. Alongside earning her doctorate, Sadrzadeh moved to the University of Oxford as an EPSRC postdoctoral fellow.

Research and career 
In 2011, Sadrzadeh was awarded an Engineering and Physical Sciences Research Council Career Acceleration Fellowship. She was appointed to the faculty at Queen Mary University of London, where she started studying how language works.

Whilst machine learning can improve reasoning about textual data, systems making use of machine learning cannot be translated to all applications. Sadrzadeh develops tensor-based mathematical models to improve these processes by combining logic, statistics and machine learning to strengthen the information from textual data. These models are based on the DisCoCat framework that she introduced with Bob Coecke and Stephen Clark. She was awarded two industrial fellowships from the Royal Academy of Engineering, which allowed her to build partnerships with the BBC. In particular she concentrated on the development of tensorial analysis for textual understanding of subtitles and news. At the time it was estimated that the average adult spends about one and a half years of their lives trying to device what to watch on broadcasting platforms. Sadrzadeh looks to improve the quality and accuracy of recommendation algorithms. In 2022, she was awarded a Royal Academy of Engineering Senior Fellowship.

Selected publications

References 

Academics of University College London
Living people
Year of birth missing (living people)
Université du Québec à Montréal alumni
Sharif University of Technology alumni
Iranian expatriate academics
Iranian emigrants to the United Kingdom